{{Infobox television
| image                    = Marvel Spider-Man Title.png
| genre                    = 
| based_on                 = 
| developer                = Kevin Shinick
| director                 = 
| creative_director        = Philip Pignotti
| voices                   = 
| theme_music_composer     = Kevin Manthei
| composer                 = Kevin Manthei
| country                  = United States
| language                 = English
| num_seasons              = 3
| num_episodes             = 58
| list_episodes            = List of Spider-Man (2017 TV series) episodes
| executive_producer       = 
| runtime                  = 21 minutes (seasons 1–2)44 minutes (season 3)
| company                  = Marvel Animation
| distributor              = Disney–ABC Domestic Television
| network                  = Disney XD
| first_aired              = 
| last_aired               = 
| preceded_by              = Ultimate Spider-Man
| followed_by              = Spider-Man: Freshman Year
| related                  = {{Plainlist|
 Guardians of the Galaxy
Hulk and the Agents of S.M.A.S.H. Avengers Assemble}}
}}Spider-Man (also known as Marvel's Spider-Man) is an American animated television series, based on the Marvel Comics character of the same name. A replacement for the previous series Ultimate Spider-Man, the first season premiered on August 19, 2017, on Disney XD. The show was subtitled Spider-Man: Maximum Venom for its third season, which premiered on April 19, 2020.

Plot
Season 1
Gifted teenager Peter Parker is given superpowers when he is bitten by a radioactive spider during a school field trip to Oscorp Industries. After the death of his Uncle Ben by a burglar that he hesitated to stop at a wrestling arena, Peter comes to his own terms of being the superhero Spider-Man. Sometime later, Peter begins learning how to balance his crime-fighting career with his new enrollment at Horizon High, a school for students with genius-level intellect run by headmaster Max Modell. Joining Peter in his ordeals against Norman Osborn, Jackal, and numerous other villains are his classmates Gwen Stacy, Miles Morales (who develops powers similar to Peter's and becomes the Ultimate Spider-Man), and Anya Corazon, as well as his best friend Harry Osborn (who eventually becomes the superhero Hobgoblin).

Besides Norman and Jackal, other villains introduced this season include Doctor Octopus, Vulture, Venom, Rhino, the Smythes (Spencer and Alistair), Hammerhead, Kraven the Hunter, Black Cat, A.I.M., Curt Connors, Sand Girl, Scorpion, and Crossbones. Other characters introduced in this season include May Parker, Flash Thompson, Liz Allan, Randy Robertson, Iron Man, Hulk, Black Widow, and Sandman.

Season 2
Taking place a few months after the previous season, Peter navigates through his sophomore year while contending with Doctor Octopus' plot of becoming the Superior Spider-Man by possessing his body. Convinced by Peter's memories of Uncle Ben into seeing the error of his ways, Otto Octavious eventually reverses the body-swap and works to restore Peter's relationships with his peers while reforming himself as an ally to Spider-Man. Towards the end of the season, Spider-Man and company discover the existence of a  cult-like organization led by Adrian Toomes called themselves the Goblin Nation, armed with the same kind of Goblin technology used by Norman.

During this season, Peter gains a career at the Daily Bugle, Anya becomes Spider-Girl alias when her Spider Powers from the "Spider-Island" incident resurface, Gwen becomes Ghost-Spider after her Spider Powers are awakened by the Blood Gem relic, and Spider-Man forms a "Spider Team" with his inner circle.

This season introduces more villains, including Chameleon, Electro, Silvermane, Regent, Beetle, Silver Sable, Tinkerer, Monica Rappaccini, MODOK, Slyde, and Eddie Brock. It also features the Goblin King, who is not Osborn but Adrian Toomes. Other characters introduced in this season include Anna Maria Marconi, Cloak, Dagger, Ms. Marvel, Yuri Watanabe, Prowler, Abraham Brown, Captain America, J. Jonah Jameson, Grady Scraps, and Captain Marvel.

Season 3 (Maximum Venom)
Taking place two weeks after the previous season, Spider-Man uncovers two separate plots centered on Venom. The most prominent is helping Max Modell save the Earth from an invasion of Klyntar summoned by Venom. The secondary plot is a conspiracy helmed by Dr. Connors to frame Max for Venom's actions. It is eventually discovered that Norman Osborn has been pulling the strings behind both Connors and Venom's actions following his near-death during the first season finale. Backed up by Hobgoblin, the Spider Team is able to expose Norman's conspiracy, resulting in Max regaining his job from Connors. Though they are able to permanently vanquish Venom and his fellow Klyntar, the Spider Team's victory comes at the cost of demolishing Horizon High. To keep the spirit of their former school alive, they convince Iron Man to help them fund a tech laboratory called Worldwide Engineering Brigade "W.E.B." at an abandoned warehouse, with Peter believing that a bright future is ahead of them.

During this season, Max admits to being aware of Spider-Man's identity since the downfall of the Goblin Nation, Gwen and Anya become aware of Spider-Man's identity and vice versa thanks to Connors' manipulations, Norman is temporarily resurrected as the Dark Goblin (a hybrid of Venom and Jackal's DNA inspired by the Green Goblin) before being reverted moments later, and Peter befriends Mary Jane Watson.

Besides Dark Goblin, other villains introduced in this season includes Scream, Scorn, Mania, Swarm, Tarantula and Baron Mordo. Other characters introduced in this season include Ironheart, Totally Awesome Hulk, Doctor Strange, Star-Lord, Groot, Marc Spector, Anti-Venom and Thor.

Episodes

Crossovers
 In Guardians of the Galaxy: Mission Breakout!, Spider-Man makes guest appearances in the episodes "Back in the New York Groove" and "Drive My Carnage", with Max Modell and Venom also appearing in the latter episode. Also in this episode, Spider-Man bonds with and becomes Venom.
 In Avengers: Black Panther's Quest, Kraven the Hunter makes a guest appearance in the episode "T'Challa Royale", and Spider-Man and the Vulture later make guest appearances in the episode "The Vibranium Curtain, Part 2".

Cast
Main cast
 Robbie Daymond – Peter Parker/Spider-Man, Kevin Wyatt, Superior Spider-Man 
 Nadji Jeter – Miles Morales/Ultimate Spider-Man/Kid Arachnid, Security Robot 
 Laura Bailey – Gwen Stacy/Ghost-Spider/Spider-Gwen, Black Widow, Crimson Dynamo, Tully 
 Melanie Minichino – Anya Corazon/Spider-Girl 
 Max Mittelman – Harry Osborn/Hobgoblin
 Scott Menville –Otto Octavius/Doctor Octopus/Living Brain, Grady Scraps, Steve 
 Fred Tatasciore – Max Modell, Hulk, Crossbones, Beetle, Klyntar Invasion Force

Guest cast
 Aaron Abrams – Tinkerer 
 Charlie Adler – MODOK, Torbert Octavius 
 Valenzia Algarin – Maria Corazon/Tarantula 
 Connor Andrade – Groot/Anti-Venom 
 Troy Baker – Kraven the Hunter
 Ogie Banks – Barkley Blitz, Abraham Brown 
 Eric Bauza – Mister Negative 
 Gregg Berger – Absorbing Man 
 Ryan Blaney – Overdrive 
 Steve Blum – Security 
 Cameron Boyce – Herman Schultz 
 Jonathan Brooks – Tiberius Stone 
 Sofia Carson – Sandgirl 
 Jim Cummings – Hammerhead, Ghost 
 Felicia Day – Mary Jane Watson 
 Alex Désert – Jefferson Davis/Swarm 
 Trevor Devall – Blizzard, Paladin 
 John DiMaggio – Raymond Warren/Jackal 
 Benjamin Diskin – Flash Thompson, Spencer Smythe, Venom (Season 1), Burglar 
 Richard Doyle – Police Officer 
 Alistair Duncan – Adrian Toomes/Vulture/Goblin King 
 Meg Donnelly – Scream 
 Teala Dunn – Panda-Mania 
 Chris Edgerly – Alan Beemont 
 Crispin Freeman – Mysterio, Spot 
 Will Friedle – Star-Lord 
 Peter Giles – Moon Knight 
 Grey Griffin – Black Cat, Scientist Supreme, Captain Marvel, Venomized Captain Marvel 
 Mark Hamill – Arnim Zola 
 Olivia Holt – Dagger, Venomized Dagger 
 Ernie Hudson – Robbie Robertson 
 Carla Jeffery – Mania 
 Bob Joles – J. Jonah Jameson 
 Aubrey Joseph – Cloak, Venomized Cloak 
 Josh Keaton – Norman Osborn/Dark Goblin/Spider-King, John Jameson/Man-Wolf, Steel Spider 
 Kathreen Khavari – Ms. Marvel, Shannon Stillwell 
 Katrina Kemp – Anna Maria Marconi 
 Phil LaMarr – Slyde, Sal Salerno (Season 2) 
 Natalie Lander – Liz Allen/Screwball 
 Ki Hong Lee – Totally Awesome Hulk, Venomized Hulk 
 Daisy Lightfoot – Electro 
 Nancy Linari – Aunt May Parker 
 Eric Lopez – Dr. Joseph Rockwell 
 Yuri Lowenthal – Curt Connors/Lizard, Clayton Cole, Nocturnal 
 Matthew Mercer – Aleksei Sytsevich/Rhino 
 Sumalee Montano – Yuri Watanabe 
 Nolan North – Silvermane 
 Liam O'Brien – Doctor Strange, Symbiote Supreme 
 Patton Oswalt – Uncle Ben Parker, Chameleon 
 Nathaniel J. Potvin – Prowler 
 Ben Pronsky – Venom (Seasons 2 & 3), Eddie Brock 
 Joe Quesada – Joe Q. 
 Leonard Roberts – Baron Mordo 
 Zeno Robinson – Randy Robertson 
 Kylee Russell – Scorn 
 Sean Schemmel – Sal Salerno (Season 1) 
 Jeremy Shada – Ross Caliban 
 Zack Shada – Hippo 
 Kevin Shinick – Bruce Banner 
 Roger Craig Smith – Captain America, Douglas, Venomized Captain America 
 Jason Spisak – Alistair Smythe, Scorpion 
 April Stewart – Silver Sable 
 Booboo Stewart – Jack O'Lantern 
 Kari Wahlgren – Lady Octopus 
 Audrey Wasilewski – Gabby Flenkman 
 Imari Williams – Regent, Molten Man 
 Travis Willingham – Sandman, Thor 
 Mick Wingert – Iron Man, Not Tony, Venomized Iron Man 
 Sofia Wylie – Ironheart, Venomized Ironheart

Production
Development
In October 2016, the series was announced by Cort Lane, senior vice president of Marvel Animation, as a replacement for the series' predecessor, Ultimate Spider-Man, which ended its run in early January 2017. Spider-Man premiered on August 19, 2017, on Disney XD.

The show was renewed for a second season, which premiered on June 18, 2018. The show was subtitled Spider-Man: Maximum Venom'' for its third season. Production on "Maximum Venom" started from around February 2019 and ended in October 2019.

Crew
 Shaun O'Neil – Character Designer
 Amanda Goodbread – Casting Director and Recording Manager
 Philip Pignotti – Supervising Director
 Kevin Shinick – Story Editor
 Collette Sunderman – ADR Voice Director (Season One), Voice Director (Season Two)
 Kris Zimmerman-Salter – Voice Director (Season One)

Broadcast
The show premiered on August 19, 2017, on Disney XD in the United States. It premiered on August 28 on Disney XD in India, and had a simulcast premiere October 14 on Disney Channel and Disney XD in Southeast Asia.

The second season premiered June 18, 2018 in the United States, and concluded on December 1, 2019. The third season premiered on April 19, 2020, and concluded on October 25, 2020.

Reception

Dave Trumbore of Collider.com reviewed the series premiere, and praised the series for basing the story around Peter Parker's scientific genius, saying "it pays off in fantastic ways". Trumbore was positive about the animation saying he liked the new look, and  also how "strong the writing and performances are".

References

External links
Marvel page: season 2

2010s American animated television series
2010s American comedy-drama television series
2010s American comic science fiction television series
2017 American television series debuts
2017 animated television series debuts
2020s American animated television series
2020s American comedy-drama television series
2020s American comic science fiction television series
2020 American television series endings
American children's animated action television series
American children's animated adventure television series
American children's animated comic science fiction television series
American children's animated drama television series
American children's animated science fantasy television series
American children's animated superhero television series
Animated Spider-Man television series
Animated television series based on Marvel Comics
Animated television series reboots
Anime-influenced Western animated television series
Disney XD original programming
Marvel Animation
Teen animated television series
Teen superhero television series
Television series by Disney–ABC Domestic Television
Television series created by Kevin Shinick
Television shows based on Marvel Comics
Television shows set in New York City